Kyritz is a town in the Ostprignitz-Ruppin district, in Brandenburg, Germany. It is situated 28 km west of Neuruppin and 28 km southeast of Pritzwalk. The town has 9,260 inhabitants (2019).

Overview
The town is situated near the Kyritzer Seenkette, a chain of lakes. The town is nicknamed "Kyritz an der Knatter" (Kyritz at the Rattle). The noise of numerous water mills along a stream parallel to the river Jäglitz was the reason for this nickname. This river channel does not exist anymore. The town includes the districts Berlitt, Bork, Drewen, Gantikow, Ganz, Holzhausen, Kötzlin, Lellichow, Mechow, Rehfeld and Teetz.

History
The oldest document mentioning the area around Kyritz as "Chorizi" was written in 948. The region was called "Prignitz". The name is derived from the Slavic word "pregynica" meaning "inaccessible woods". A castle was built here in 1148, and little by little a town developed close to the castle. In the year 1225 a Franciscan friary was established here (dissolved in 1552). The first document in which the name "Kyritz" was mentioned dates from 1232. It obtained municipal status in 1237 and got the privilege to produce its own coins. A wall around the town was built in the 14th century. Kyritz became a member of the Hanseatic League in 1359. The merchants living in Kyritz sold wheat, clothes, wood, wool, linnen and hop to other member towns of the Hanseatic League and they bought metals, spices, wine and fish from other places. Goods from Lübeck, the headquarters of the Hanseatic League, were sold duty-free in Kyritz. In 1488 the first brewery was founded in Kyritz. The beer was named "Mord und Totschlag" (Murder and Manslaughter) and it is still brewed in Neuzelle.
 
In 1600 Count Hans Christoff von Königsmarck was born in Kötzlin, a leading Swedish general in the Thirty Years' War who is most famous for attempting to conquer Prague in 1648. In 1626, 800 citizens of Kyritz died from the bubonic plague. From 1806 to 1814 Kyritz was occupied by French soldiers.  After Napoleon's defeat n 1814 the "Peace Oak" was planted in the Market Place.

Sights
St. Mary's Church was founded in the 14th century. It burnt down in the Thirty  Years' War in 1622 and was not rebuilt before 1714. Inside there is a pulpit dating fron 1714 and a baptismal font from the 16th century. The Town Hall was built with a clock tower in 1879 and renovated in 1994 and 2013. The Oak of Peace in the Market place was planted in 1814 afer Napoleon's defeat. There are various half-timbered houses in Kyritz dating from the 18th and 19th century, e.g. Eichhorstsches Haus in Johann-Sebastian-Bach-Str. dating from 1663 which is famous its wood-carvings. A part of the medieval wall consisting of bricks around the town is well-preserved. The wall was renovated in 2013. At the end of Mauerstraße a half round defensive tower was transformed into a residential building, a house of this kind is called "Wiekhaus" in German.

Demography

Twin towns - sister cities
Kyritz is twinned with:
 Bailleul, France
 Svalöv, Sweden
 Wałcz, Poland
 Werne, Germany

Photogallery

References

External links

Localities in Ostprignitz-Ruppin
Members of the Hanseatic League